Stefan Müller or Mueller may refer to:

 Stefan Müller (athlete) (born 1979), Swiss javelin thrower
 Stefan Müller (mathematician) (born 1962), German mathematician
 Stefan Müller (footballer, born 1974), retired German footballer
 Stefan Müller (footballer, born 1988), German footballer who currently plays for Karlsruher SC
 Stefan Müller (footballer, born 1990), German footballer who currently plays for FC Ingolstadt 04
 Stefan Mueller (soccer, born 1995), American footballer
 Stefan Müller (canoeist), Swiss slalom canoeist
 Stefan Mueller, a fictional Nazi in the Columbo Season 5 episode "Now You See Him..."
 Stefan Müller (linguist), German linguist
 Stefan Müller (politician) (born 1975)

See also 
Stephen Mueller (1947–2011), American painter